Plesna or variants may refer to places:

Czech Republic
 Plesná, a town in the Karlovy Vary region
 , suburb of Ostrava
 Lackenberg, a mountain in the Bohemian Forest region

Poland
 Gmina Pleśna, a gmina in Lesser Poland Voivodeship
 Pleśna, Lesser Poland Voivodeship
 Pleśna, West Pomeranian Voivodeship

Ukraine
 , a village in the Shepetivka Raion